USS LST-27 was a United States Navy  used exclusively in the Europe-Africa-Middle East Theater during World War II and manned by a United States Coast Guard crew. Like many of her class, she was not named and is properly referred to by her hull designation.

Construction
LST-27 was laid down on 10 December  1942, at Pittsburgh, Pennsylvania, by the Dravo Corporation; launched on 27 April 1943; sponsored by Mrs. R. R. Creed; and commissioned on 25 June 1943.

Service history
On 4 April 1944, she was in the Mediterranean reaching Tunisia, on 13 April 1944. There are records that indicate she traveled from Oran, Algeria, joining Convoy MKS 46 sometime after 9 April 1944, arriving in Gibraltar on 21 April 1944. She departed Gibraltar on 22 April 1944, with Convoy MKS 46G to rendezvous with Convoy SL 155 on April 23, 1944, arriving in Liverpool on 3 May 1944.

She participated in the invasion at Omaha Beach. LST-27 departing from Trebah near Falmouth, Cornwall, for the Normandy coast on 5 June 1944, transporting units of the 29th Infantry Division. She remained in British waters until 2 July 1944, when she departed for Norfolk, Virginia, arriving there on 17 July 1944.

Postwar career
LST-27 was decommissioned on 9 November 1945, at Boston, and was struck from the Navy list on 28 November 1945. On 15 December 1947, she was sold to the Rhode Island Navigation Co., of Newport, Rhode Island, for scrapping.

Awards
LST-27 earned two battle stars for her World War II service.

References

Bibliography

External links

 

LST-1-class tank landing ships of the United States Navy
World War II amphibious warfare vessels of the United States
Ships built in Pittsburgh
1943 ships
United States Navy ships crewed by the United States Coast Guard
Ships built by Dravo Corporation